Ahmet Burak Solakel (born 1 March 1982) is a Turkish former footballer who played as a defender.

Career

Elazığspor
On the last day of the January transfermarket 2019, Solakel was one of 22 players on two hours, that signed for Turkish club Elazığspor. had been placed under a transfer embargo but managed to negotiate it with the Turkish FA, leading to them going on a mad spree of signing and registering a load of players despite not even having a permanent manager in place. In just two hours, they managed to snap up a record 22 players - 12 coming in on permanent contracts and a further 10 joining on loan deals until the end of the season.

References

External links
 Guardian Stats Centre
 

1982 births
Living people
Turkish footballers
Denizlispor footballers
Gaziantepspor footballers
Karşıyaka S.K. footballers
Elazığspor footballers
TFF First League players
Süper Lig players
Turkey youth international footballers
Association football defenders